Tomasz Nawotka (born 14 February 1997) is a Polish professional footballer who plays for Sandecja Nowy Sącz.

Career
In 2014 Nawotka went to Polish footballing giants Legia Warsaw and was put into the reserves team.

On 11 January 2019 it was announced that Nawotka would join Zagłębie Sosnowiec on loan for the second time from Legia Warsaw.

On 19 August 2020 he joined ŁKS Łódź on loan with an option to buy.

References

External links
 

1997 births
Living people
Polish footballers
Polish expatriate footballers
Poland youth international footballers
Legia Warsaw players
Legia Warsaw II players
Zagłębie Sosnowiec players
MFK Zemplín Michalovce players
ŁKS Łódź players
Sandecja Nowy Sącz players
Ekstraklasa players
I liga players
II liga players
III liga players
Slovak Super Liga players
Sportspeople from Olsztyn
Association football wingers
Association football fullbacks
Polish expatriate sportspeople in Slovakia
Expatriate footballers in Slovakia